FirstCry is an Indian e-commerce company, headquartered in Pune. The company, launched in 2010, initially focused on baby products retailing. In January 2020, the company had over 380 stores across India. FirstCrys opened its first outlet in Srinagar in May 2019. It is into its series E round of financing.

Mergers and acquisitions 
The merged entity now does business under the name FirstCry.com, a FirstCry Mahindra Venture. The company acquired playschool company Oi Playschool.

Funding
FirstCry raised INR 95 Cr ($13 Mn) in an equity funding round from pi Ventures.

References

External links

Online retailers of India
Indian companies established in 2010
Indian brands
Retail companies established in 2010